"Katie Wants a Fast One" is a song co-written by American country music artist Steve Wariner and recorded by Wariner and Garth Brooks. It was released in June 2000 as the second single from Wariner's album Faith in You. The song reached No. 22 on the Billboard Hot Country Singles & Tracks chart and peaked at No. 10 on the Canadian RPM Country Tracks chart.  Wariner wrote the song with Rick Carnes.

Background
Wariner told Billboard magazine that the song was "kind of a cross between Hank Williams' 'Honky Tonkin'' and a country mambo."

Chart performance
"Katie Wants a Fast One" debuted at number 75 on the U.S. Billboard Hot Country Singles & Tracks as an album cut for the week of June 17, 2000.

References

2000 singles
2000 songs
Steve Wariner songs
Garth Brooks songs
Songs written by Steve Wariner
Male vocal duets
Capitol Records Nashville singles